The 2021 Junior Pan American Rhythmic Gymnastics Championships was held in Guatemala City, Guatemala, June 25–27, 2021.

Medal summary

Medal table

References

2021 in gymnastics
Pan American Gymnastics Championships
International gymnastics competitions hosted by Guatemala
Pan American Rhythmic Gymnastics Championships
Pan American Rhythmic Gymnastics Championships